30 Aquarii is a single star located about 301 light years away from the Sun in the zodiac constellation of Aquarius. 30 Aquarii is its Flamsteed designation. It is visible to the naked eye as a dim, orange-hued star with an apparent visual magnitude of 5.56. The star is moving further from the Earth with a heliocentric radial velocity of 40 km/s.

This object is an aging G-type giant star with a stellar classification of G8 III, although Houk and Swift (1999) found a class of K1 IV. It is a red clump giant, which indicates it is on the horizontal branch and is generating energy through helium fusion at its core. The star is nearly two billion years old with a leisurely rotation rate, showing a projected rotational velocity of 1.6 km/s. It has double the mass of the Sun and has expanded to ten times the Sun's radius. The star is radiating 55 times the luminosity of the Sun from its swollen photosphere at an effective temperature of 4,944 K.

References

External links
 

G-type giants
K-type giants
Horizontal-branch stars
Aquarius (constellation)
Durchmusterung objects
Aquarii, 030
209396
108868
8401